Talespinner Children's Theatre (TCT) is a professional theater for child audiences based in  Cleveland, Ohio. Its inaugural season began in early 2012, and since its inception has been based in the Reinberger Auditorium in the Gordon Square neighborhood in the city's Near West Side.

TCT specializes in presenting imaginative original work inspired by or adapted from classic tales from world literature. To date, each play produced (adapted from fables, folktales, myths and literature) has been an original work commissioned by TCT from a Cleveland-area playwright. Presented on the thrust, platform stage in the Reinberger Auditorium, productions feature small ensembles of adult actors, utilizing puppets, dance, movement, music and song and fantastical costumes to bring each play to life for young audiences.

TCT also provides theater-arts classes for children throughout the year.

Founded by Artistic Director Alison Garrigan, TCT has a board of directors and paid staff.

Critical response

During its decade of history, TCT has received strong support from Cleveland area critics. Rave and Pan blog reviewer Christine Howey has said their work is "always engaging" and CoolCleveland.com has asserted that "performances at Talespinner Children’s Theatre are always magical".

Awards
Cleveland Critics Circle, Special Recognition (2013) "for producing shows for kids that adults can enjoy, using local writers as adaptors and playwrights".

Productions

2022 season
 Aponibolinayen in the Sky (a tale of the Philippines) by by Elana and Les Hunter
 The Snowy Day and Other Stories by Ezra Jack Keats Adapted for the stage by Jerome Hairston, Based on the books by Ezra Jack Keats
 Hook & Smee by [T. Paul Lowry]]
 Everything I Feel Newly Devised

2018 season
 The Oba Asks For a Mountain (A Tale of Nigeria) by Gail Nyoka
 The Princess & The Nightingale (A Tale of Thailand) by Marian Fairman
 The Boy Who Stole the Sun (and Other Native American Stories) adapted by Alison Garrigan
 A Song in the Flame (A Tale of Israel) by Margi Herwald Zitelli
 Jan & The Trickster (A Polish Tale of Magic) by Krysia Orlowski

2017 season
 The Brementown Musicians adapted by Claire Robinson May
 Red Onion, White Garlic (a tale of Indonesia) adapted by David Hansen
 Sundiata (a tale of Mali) adapted by Nina Domingue Glover
 The Rainbow Serpent (a tale of Aboriginal Australia) adapted by Christopher Johnston
 Mr. Scrooge's Ghosts (a Dickens of a Holiday tale) adapted by Michael Sepesy

2016 season
 Peter and the Wolf (based on the work of Sergei Prokofiev) adapted by Greg Vovos
 Golden (a Grimm's Faerie tale) adapted by Toni K. Thayer
 The Crocodile, the Cobra, and the Girl Down the Well (a Tale of India) adapted by Anne McEvoy
 The Mummies and the Magic Prince (a Tale of Egyptian Mythology) adapted by Michael Sepesy
 Hook & Smee (a Tale of Never Never Land) adapted by T. Paul Lowry

2015 season
 The Fisherman and the Moon (Why Moon Reflects on Water) adapted by Alison Garrigan
 Fire On The Water (Part Four of the Elements Cycle) a special presentation produced in collaboration with Cleveland Public Theatre
 Rosalynde & The Falcon (a Topsy-Turvy Tale of England) by David Hansen
 The Silent Princess (a Turkish Folktale) adapted by Claire Robinson May
 Finn McCool (a Tale of Irish Mythology) adapted by Christopher Johnston
 Prince Ivan & The Firebird (a Russian Tale of Magic) adapted by Alison Garrigan

2014 season
 Aesop's Pirate Adventure By Michael Sepesy
 The Floating Dolls (a Polish Folktale) Adapted by Toni K. Thayer
 Loki & Lucy (a Norse Mythology Story) By Michael Geither
 Clara and the Nutcracker Adapted by Anne McEvoy

2013 season
 The Tinderbox by Hans Christian Andersen, Adapted by Mike Geither
 The Emperor's Ears (A Serbian Folktale) Adapted by Michael Sepesy
 Adventures In Slumberland (Based on the Characters of Winsor McCay) By David Hansen

2012 season
 The Tale of the Name of the Tree (A Bantu Tale) Adapted by Michael Sepesy
 Magic Flute Adapted by Anne McEvoy

References

External links
Talespinner Children's Theatre website

Theatre companies in Ohio
Arts organizations established in 2012
Children's theatre
2012 establishments in Ohio
Culture of Cleveland
Performing groups established in 2012
Theatre company production histories